Loukhsky (masculine), Loukhskaya (feminine), or Loukhskoye (neuter) may refer to:
Loukhsky District, a district of the Republic of Karelia, Russia
Loukhskoye Urban Settlement, a municipal formation which the urban-type settlement of Loukhi in Loukhsky District of the Republic of Karelia, Russia is incorporated as